Combe Wood and Linkenholt Hanging is a  biological Site of Special Scientific Interest south of Hungerford in Berkshire. It is in the North Wessex Downs, which is an Area of Outstanding Natural Beauty.

Most of this site is semi-natural woodland on rendzina (humus-rich and shallow) soils. There are also areas of woods on chalk and acid soils, together with some chalk grassland and scrub. The woods have many fallow deer and birds while the grassland has a rich chalk flora and a variety of insects.

Fauna
The site has the following animals:

Mammals
Fallow deer
Roe deer
Muntjac deer
Fox
Hare
Rabbit

Birds
Nuthatch

Invertebrates
Pyrochroa coccinea
Malthodes fibulatus
Malthodes maurus
Malthodes mysticus
Volucella pellucens
Neoitamus cyanura
Speckled wood
Limenitis camilla
Purple hairstreak
Platycheirus scutatus
Pyrausta nigrata
Tetrix undulata
Melanargia galathea
Dark green fritillary
Hummingbird hawk-moth

Flora
The site has the following flora:

Trees
Birch
Fraxinus
Acer campestre
Quercus robur
Ulmus glabra
Beech
Whitebeam
Hazel

Plants
Pteridium aquilinum
Chamerion angustifolium
Hyacinthoides non-scripta
Mercurialis perennis
Euphorbia amygdaloides
Polygonatum multiflorum
Anemone nemorosa
Orchis mascula
Myosotis sylvatica
Lathraea squamaria
Paris quadrifolia
Galium odoratum
Gentianella amarella
Saxifraga granulata
Campanula glomerata
Dactylorhiza fuchsii
Crataegus monogyna
Cornus sanguinea
Ligustrum vulgare
Geum urbanum
Helianthemum nummularium

Lichens
Bacidia biatorina
Bacidia atropurpurea
Opegrapha ochrocheila
Pertusaria hemisphaerica
Thelotrema lepadinum
Strangospora ochrophora
Peltigera horizontalis

Mosses
Orthotrichum lyellii
Zygodon baumgartneri
Leucodon sciuroides
Neckera pumila
Heterocladium heteropterum

Access
The site is crossed by public footpaths.

References

Sites of Special Scientific Interest in Berkshire